Islev is a suburb, located approximately 10 km west of central Copenhagen, Denmark. The suburb consists of single-family detached houses and a commercial area. The suburb is connected to Copenhagen by the S-train. Islev Station is located just east of the border between Islev and Vanløse, just outside Islev itself.

Geography of Copenhagen